Hornung is a surname. Notable people with the surname include:

Clarence P. Hornung (1899–1998), American graphic designer
Dirk Hornung, German curler
Erik Hornung (born 1933), German Egyptologist
Ernest William Hornung (1866–1921), British author
Joe Hornung (1857–1931), American baseball player
Larry Hornung (1945–2001), Canadian ice hockey player
Otto Hornung R.P.S.L. (1920–2013), philatelist, postal historian and member of the Czecho-Slovak Legion in Poland and Russia 1939–1945
Paul Hornung (1935–2020), American football player

It was also a Frankish name for the month of February, introduced by Charlemagne; see .

See also
 Operation Hornung, a 1943 Nazi security campaign in Belarus
 Horning (surname) 
 Hörning